Mulenge is a village of the grouping in Uvira territory, South Kivu, Democratic Republic of Congo. It is located on the high plateaus of the Itombwe massif, overlooking the locality of Uvira. The area was inhabited by the remnants of the autochthonous population of African Pygmies and Bantu ethnic groups such as Bambuti, Bafuliiru, Batwa and Bavira. The southeastern slope is inhabited by the Babembe, related to the Warega of the west, great hunters and ancient warriors. The region is among the most productive in the country, with two crops that can normally be harvested each year. Principal food crops include bananas, sweet potatoes, cassava, maize, rice, sorghum, beans, soybean and tomato.

History 
Mulenge was the political and the spiritual chiefdom of the Fuliiru people, a Bantu-speaking ethnic group who live in the eastern part of Democratic Republic of Congo, stretching to the border with Burundi, Rwanda, Uganda and Tanzania. 

The name “Mulenge” originally came from the Fuliiru language when they arrived in South Kivu during their exodus from Luindi, a stream In North Kivu. They subsequently discovered mountainous terrain and other fertile lands, such as, Bibangwa, Bikenge, Kukanga, Bushajaga, Kahungwe, Butumba, Kabere, Karava, Kalengera, Kahololo, Kalimba, Karaguza, Kahungwe, Kasheke, Kiryama, Kanga, Kashagala, Kasenya, Kishugwe, Lubembe, Kihinga, Mangwa, Miduga, Kitembe, Mibere, Kitija, Muhanga, Kabamba, Kaduma, Mushojo, Masango, Kitoga, Mashuba, Mulama, Kagaragara, Ndegu, Rurambira, Rugeje, Rubuga, Rusako, Sogoti, Taba, Sange, Kabunambo, etc.

The Fuliiru were formerly a highly centralized state in the seventeenth century living near the Bambutti pygmies, whom they called “Wambotte” and whom they employ as servants and hunters. They were fierce warriors and skilled in craftsmanship, iron metallurgy, animal husbandry and especially fishing and trade. The cross-checking of different versions collected by the first European ethnologists, colonial administers, anthropologists and cartographers working in Uvira disclose that all the territory along part of the northern west coast of Ruzizi, from Uvira to Luvungi, belonged to the Bahamba dynasty of Bufuliru, which had its capital at Lemera, to the northwest of the plain. Lemera, a village situated nearby to Kasheke and Nyambasha, takes its name from Mulemera, father of Kahamba, true founder of the Bufuliru dynasty.

In the 19th century, the village developed into a vast agglomeration in the far north of Lake Tanganyika. It housed Tutsi and Hutu shepherds, who had been leading their herds to the Itombwe Highlands. Some ethnologists or anthropologists (Olga Boone, David Newbury and Catherine Newbury) speak of these pastors as “foreign groups” who settled west of Baraka, in Fizi territory, among the Babembe.

In the late 1950s, 1960s, and 1970s, and during the Rwandan Genocide, there was an influx of Hutu and Tutsi refugees into the region, increasing a diversified tribal population.

On October 1998, at the beginning of the Second Congo War, many criminal offenses were committed by the Alliance of Democratic Forces for the Liberation of Congo (AFDLC) and many civilians perished in Uvira, including the former Mulenge post chief, Ladislas Matalambu, who was killed on October 1, 1998 at 7:30 p.m. Incidentally, Alexis Deyidedi, former administrative secretary of the Bafulero chiefdom, was assassinated on October 2, 1998 at 11 p.m.

On 10 June 2004, up to 3,500 Congolese, mostly Bafulero and Babembe, fled to Burundi, fleeing ethnic persecution.

Climate 
In Mulenge, the wet season is hot, humid, and overcast and the dry season is warm and partly cloudy. Over the course of the year, the temperature typically varies from 62 °F to 86 °F and is rarely below 59 °F or above 90 °F.

References 

Populated places in South Kivu